Haxby Hall was an estate in York Road, village of Haxby, York, England. It was built in 1790 on 22 acres (89,000 m2) of land, and was grade II listed.

In 1923, Haxby Hall was the residence of Mr. William Abel Wood, J.P. During the Second World War, the hall was used to billet evacuees from Hull.

In 1950, the owner of the estate, Kenneth Ward, donated the pleasure grounds around the building to the village (which is now part of the City of York), to build the Ethel Ward Memorial Playing Field. The playing field now contains a children's playground, ball playing courts, a scout centre, and more. It is also the location of the village fairs and celebrations, and the home of the Haxby football teams, who play in the York and District League.

Haxby Hall itself, now with only 3 acres (12,000 m2) of land, was demolished in 1960, and in 1965 it was replaced by the Haxby Hall Residential Home for the elderly (with accommodations for 52 elderly people), and an adjoining ambulance station.

References

Buildings and structures demolished in 1960
Parks and commons in York
Demolished buildings and structures in England